Topographia Galliae (1655–1661) is a German-language series of illustrated books created by engraver Matthäus Merian and writer Martin Zeiler, and published in Frankfurt. It describes cities and towns in 17th-century France. Wenceslaus Hollar also contributed to its engravings.

Volumes
  1655- (13 volumes)
 ; via Google Books 
 Contents: Paris, Île-de-France; index
 
 Contents: Picardy province; index
 
 
 
 
 Contents: Lyon
 
 
 Contents: Chartres, Orléans, etc.; index
 
 
 
 Contents: Bayonne, Bordeaux, etc.; index
 
 Contents: Montpelier, Toulouse, etc.
 
 Contents: Avignon, etc.
 
 Contents: Grenoble, etc.

See also
 Merian map of Paris

References

Further reading
 Topographia Galliae. Amsterdam: Joost Broersz and Caspart Mérian, 1660.

External links

 WorldCat

Geographic history of France
1650s books
Books about France
Geography books
17th century in France